Qazançı (also, Gazanchy and Gazanchi) is a village in the Goranboy District of Azerbaijan. The village forms part of the municipality of Goranly.

References 

Populated places in Goranboy District